Benham may refer to:

People
 Benham (surname)

Places
 Benham Park, Berkshire, England
 Benham, Indiana, an unincorporated community
 Benham, Kentucky, United States
 Benham Falls, a series of rapids in Oregon, United States
 Benham Plateau, also known as the Benham Rise

Other uses
 USS Benham (DD-49), Aylwin-class destroyer
 USS Benham (DD-397), Benham-class destroyer
 USS Benham (DD-796), Fletcher-class destroyer
 Benham (automobile), an automobile produced in Detroit, Michigan from 1914 to 1917

See also
 Marsh Benham, Berkshire, England